McGaw is a surname. Notable people with the surname include:

Alfred McGaw (1900–1984), English cricketer and British Army officer
Charles A. McGaw, American politician
Foster G. McGaw (1897–1986), American philanthropist
Jack McGaw, Canadian journalist
Leland McGaw (born 1927), Canadian politician
Mark McGaw, Australian rugby league player
Patrick McGaw (born 1967), American actor
Ray McGaw (1937–2001), Australian rules footballer
Samuel McGaw (1838–1878), Scottish Victoria Cross recipient
Walt McGaw (1899–?), American footballer
Wes McGaw (1951–1981), Australian rules footballer

See also 
 Gaw (surname)